Light Years is the forty-fourth album by American singer-guitarist Glen Campbell, released in 1988 by MCA. The album features eight songs written by Jimmy Webb, including the singles "Light Years" and "More Than Enough".

Track listing
All songs were written by Jimmy Webb, except where indicated.

Side 1
 "Lightning in a Bottle" – 4:03
 "If These Walls Could Speak" – 2:58
 "More Than Enough" – 2:53
 "Brand New Eyes" – 2:29
 "Show Me the Way to Go" (Jeff Tweel) – 2:57

Side 2
 "Light Years" – 3:47
 "Heart of the Matter" (Michael Smotherman) – 3:01
 "Almost Alright Again" – 3:27
 "Saturday Night" – 2:32
 "Our Movie" – 3:33

Personnel
Music
 Glen Campbell – vocals, acoustic guitar, electric guitar, harmony vocals
 T.J. Kuenster – piano, synthesizer
 Mike Lawler – synthesizer
 Billy Joe Walker Jr. – acoustic guitar
 Reggie Young – electric guitar
 David Hungate – bass
 Russ Kunkel – drums, percussion
 Sandy Campbell Brink – harmony vocals
 Gail Davies – harmony vocals

Production
 Jimmy Bowen – producer
 Glen Campbell – producer
 Russ Martin – engineer
 Marty Williams – engineer
 Mark J. Coddington – engineer
 Chuck Ainlay – engineer
 Willie Pevear – recording at Soundstage Studios, Nashville, TN
 Simon Levy – art direction
 Peter Nash – photography
 Jackson Design – design

Chart performance

Album

Singles

References
Citations

Bibliography

Glen Campbell albums
1988 albums
MCA Records albums
Albums produced by Jimmy Bowen